The men's shot put at the 2006 European Athletics Championships were held at the Ullevi on August 7.

Ralf Bartels was outside the podium before the final attempt, having managed 20.57 in his first five, whereas Andrei Mikhnevich and Joachim Olsen had achieved their best attempts in round two. However, Bartels put the shot two centimetres further than Mikhnevich, and despite Olsen coming up with a second 21-metre put with 21.04 in his final attempt, it was not enough to better his previous attempts.

In 2013 it was revealed that Mikhnevich tested positive for prohibited substances at the 2005 World Championships. Since this was his second offense, he was given a lifetime ban and all his results from August 2005 on were annulled. In addition, the results of finalists Ville Tiisanoja and Yuriy Bilonoh were also voided for doping offences as indicated in the official results at the European Athletics website.

Medalists

Schedule

Results

Qualification
Qualification: Qualifying Performance 20.20 (Q) or at least 12 best performers (q) advance to the final.

Final

External links
Results

Shot put
Shot put at the European Athletics Championships